Memoirs of a Suicide (Portuguese: Memórias de um Suicida) is a channeled afterlife account psychographed by the Brazilian spiritist medium Yvonne do Amaral Pereira, whose authorship is attributed to the spirit of Portuguese writer Camilo Castelo Branco.

Plot  
The book was originally published by the Brazilian Spiritist Federation in 1954, twelve years after its writing, allegedly because it did not fit the usual spiritist novel profile. The plot is centered on the afterlife story of Camilo Cândido Botelho (a spiritual pseudonym of Camilo Castelo Branco), who committed suicide after going blind, on 1 June 1890.

He was utterly surprised when his soul survived death. He feels the terrible pain from the shot to his right ear and his brain, waking up among the putrid smell of his own corpse. Hearing the voices of a crowd he compulsively joins to, all of them are forcefully brought to an inhospitable, dark and horrendous low astral place, the so-called «Valley of the Suicides», where like-minded spirits of suicides are localized. The scenery is hellish, full of an overall despair, never ending noise, horrible screaming and crying. The sky is darkly cloudy and thunderous, the atmosphere is cold and foul smelling, the ground is muddy and excremental. The valley is surrounded by lurid dark caves. Those unfortunate spirits are reliving over and over the tragic circumstances of their self-inflicted deaths. One is not restricted to one's own despair but is sharing others sufferings too. The lowest and darkest instincts come to the fore and spirits are never at peace with each other. One can never sleep or take a moment of rest or privacy. The most perverse and violent acts are commonplace. One can easily be a victim or become a tormentor. Even the most horrid conditions on Earth turn heaven-like compared to the sufferings in the «Valley of the Suicides».

After more than ten years of incessant suffering, aggravated by the belief that it was an eternal and hellish punishment, Camilo, was totally exhausted, both physically and mentally. Finally he was rescued by the Servants of Mary, spiritual helpers who took him to the Mary of Nazareth astral hospital, in the twilight zone of a spiritual city.

There the account unfolds with the revelation of the stories of his fellows of misfortune, the pains that caused their self-undoing, their plans for reparatory rebirth and, finally, the karmic cause of Camilo's blindness and his project of upliftment through reincarnation.

The book is a cautionary tale about suicide. Death does not put an end to the suffering of a suicide. On the contrary, it aggravates it and prolongs it, years and sometimes centuries long in the low astral realms. Upon a new rebirth on Earth, most probably one has to endure again the same challenges one had tried to escape through suicide, further aggravated by more physical and existential handicaps than before.

This work was released in 2013 as a radionovela, authorized by the Brazilian Spiritist Federation, on the initiative of José de Paiva-Netto, CEO of Legião da Boa Vontade.

References

External links 
 Camilo Castelo Branco: Um Estudo de Fontes à Luz do Espiritismo
 Memórias de um suicida
 O drama de Camilo Castelo Branco
O Martírio dos Suicidas por Almerindo Martins de Castro

Books about spirituality
Spiritism
Portuguese literature
1954 novels